La Cisterna (Spanish for "the cistern") is a commune of Chile and census-designated city located in Santiago Province, Santiago Metropolitan Region. It was founded on 30 May 1925. It is part of Greater Santiago.

Demographics
The population fell by 10.1% (9594 persons) between the 1992 and 2002 censuses. The 2006 projected population was 78,402.

Stats
Average annual household income: US$38,305 (PPP, 2006)
Population below poverty line: 8.6% (2006)
Regional quality of life index: 81.78, high, 8 out of 52 (2005)
Human Development Index: 0.775, 24 out of 341 (2003)

Administration
As a commune, La Cisterna is a third-level administrative division of Chile administered by a municipal council, headed by an alcalde who is directly elected every four years. The 2012-2016 alcalde is Santiago Rebolledo Pizarro (PPD). The communal council has the following members:
 Patricio Ossandón Ortiz (PS)
 Maria Angelica Pinedo (DC)
 Orlando Morales Becerra (PPD)
 Patricia Acevedo González (UDI)
 Alexis Flores Ahumada (UDI)
 Bernardo Suárez Ortiz (RN)
 Marcelo Luna Campillay (PPD)
 Ximena Tobar Vásquez (PS)

Within the electoral divisions of Chile, La Cisterna is represented in the Chamber of Deputies by Tucapel Jiménez (PPD) and Iván Moreira (UDI) as part of the 27th electoral district, (together with El Bosque and San Ramón). The commune is represented in the Senate by Soledad Alvear (PDC) and Pablo Longueira (UDI) as part of the 8th senatorial constituency (Santiago-East).

See also
 List of mayors of La Cisterna

References

External links

  Municipality of La Cisterna

Populated places in Santiago Province, Chile
Geography of Santiago, Chile
Communes of Chile
Populated places established in 1925
1925 establishments in Chile